The Looking Glass War is a 1965 spy novel by John le Carré. Written in response to the positive public reaction to his previous novel, The Spy Who Came in from the Cold, the book explores the unglamorous nature of espionage and the danger of nostalgia. The book tells the story of an incompetent British intelligence agency known as The Department and its multiple botched attempts to verify a Communist defector's story of a Soviet missile buildup in East Germany. Some editions hyphenate "Looking Glass".

Plot

During the early 1960s, the formerly renowned British military intelligence organisation known colloquially as "The Department" is floundering. Surviving on long past memories of its aerial reconnaissance missions during the Second World War the organisation has been reduced to a skeleton crew consisting of Leclerc, a nostalgic former air commander who now languishes in bureaucracy as Director, John Avery, his 32 year old aide who took the job after failing as a publisher, Taylor, a middle-aged man who views the job as his last chance at glory, and Haldane, a pompous intellectual in ailing health whose research on the Soviet Union and East Germany has been the sole reason for departmental funding from Whitehall. Languishing in the mundanity of bureaucratic battles and inconsequential desk work, the organisation desperately desire the opportunity to regain their standing in the intelligence community, as well as to gain a one up against their now superior rivals in the Circus, headed by chief "Control" and his second-in-command, George Smiley.

The Department gets its wish when a defector passes information to the organisation regarding a build-up of Soviet missiles in the fictional town of Kalkstadt, near Lübeck across the border in West Germany. With the Cuban Missile Crisis in mind, they quickly manufacture a plan to act, and bribe a commercial pilot to accidentally stray off course and photograph the site in the hopes of verification. Taylor is then dispatched to Finland to rendezvous with the pilot. After collecting the film, Taylor is killed in a hit-and-run incident, which Leclerc interprets as an attempt to recapture the film by the Stasi. Further setbacks occur when Avery is dispatched to recover Taylor and his effects from the Finns when his documentation doesn't match Finnish information.

Despite the setbacks and their lack of any recent field action, Leclerc persuades the Minister to allow them to send an agent over the Inner German Border into East Germany. Fearing the Circus will take the operation over, the Department is deliberately vague, and presents the entire operation as a training exercise in order to obtain old radio transmitters from Smiley. The Department then tracks down one of its old agents, a middle-aged naturalised Pole called Fred Leiser. Now a mechanic, Leiser has been out of the game a long time and knows little about the current circumstances of the intelligence community. Hoping to stave off any apprehension from Leiser, Haldane and Avery lie to him and tell him the Department is still the dominant espionage unit and is operating at the size it was at its wartime peak. Avery and Leiser become fast friends, with each feeling that the other is mutually beneficial. Avery believes that if Leiser's operation is successful, he will finally have accomplished something in his life that he can be proud of, whilst Leiser, currently in the midst of a mid-life crisis feels the operation is his chance to feel useful again and relive his wartime glory.

In order to train Leiser, the Department leases house in north Oxford. Leiser is restricted to a precise daily training routine, and is allowed specific recreational activities on the condition he is accompanied one of the handlers on the training crew. Over the course of their time in Oxford, it becomes increasingly apparent that Leiser has lost his touch. He is repeatedly beaten with ease during his combat training sparring, whilst Avery helps him to cheat during their Morse code training. Towards the end of his training period, however, Leiser begins to improve, and is able to pass all of his field readiness evaluations, including sending Morse code messages whilst changing frequencies every two minutes to avoid detection which he had previously struggled with.

Posing as academics, the Department sets up in a house close to the border, furnished by the NAAFI. Leiser is taken on a driving tour where he is shown his entry point into East Germany, and then returned to the house to eat a final meal before crossing. It is at this point Leiser is informed he cannot take a firearm across the border with him, causing him to panic. During the inner-German border crossing, Leiser again panics and kills a young East German guard, which is published in East German media. Now panicking, Leiser steals a motorcycle and meets a young German girl in a nearby town. In exchange for information and use of her flat to transmit, Leiser agrees to give her sexual companionship.

During his first transmission, Leiser again falls under the strain of the operation and forgets to change frequency regularly whilst transmitting. As a result he spends 6 minutes on the same frequency slowly transmitting, instead of the maximum of two-and-a-half. This alerts the East Germans, who triangulate his position and converge on his hotel. News reaches Smiley and Control of the situation, and the conversation strongly implies Leiser's failure may have been engineered by Control.

The police discover Leiser in the girl's flat. Now fully aware of the Department's plan, Smiley is sent by the Ministry to bring the Department's men stationed in West Germany back to London and terminate the operation.

The following ending does not appear in the original novel:

Smiley explains that Leiser's total ineptitude, combined with his old equipment, will make it easier for him to say he is not a spy. Leclerc and Haldane are tempted further by an extension of the Department's research section at the Circus with more funding, whilst only Avery weeps bitterly about the mission's failure. Having successfully escaped the hotel, Leiser takes refuge with the girl he met. The police encircle him and storm the apartment, the last time that Leiser is seen.

The missile site, meanwhile, almost certainly never existed. The defector has a history of trying to sell fabricated "information" to Western services, the photographs he provided as evidence are dubious, and Leiser was unable to corroborate any part of his story.

Characters 
 Leclerc: Director of the "Department;" he can't let go of his glory days running successful aerial operations during WWII.
 Adrian Haldane: Veteran intelligence officer for the Department, who has served since World War II. Assigned to run the operation and handle Leiser's training and infiltration into East Germany. Jaded and in ill health.
 John Avery: 32-year-old aide to Leclerc, personally assigned by Leclerc to assist Haldane in training Leiser.
 Fred Leiser: naturalised Pole who served as a recruited agent for the Department during World War II; has forgotten or is out of practice in nearly all his clandestine skills.
 Jack Johnson: Veteran wireless operator for the Department, assigned to refresh Leiser's wireless skills on an obsolete, World War II-vintage radio set.
 George Smiley: Intelligence officer and envoy from the Circus.
 Control: Director ("operational control") of the Circus.

Background and reception

According to le Carré in a foreword written for the 2013 Penguin Publishing reissue, the book was written as a direct response to the public reaction to his previous novel, The Spy Who Came in from the Cold. While le Carré had intended that novel as a deconstruction of the mythos that had sprung up around MI6 in the post-war era, he was disturbed that most readers in the United Kingdom regarded it as a romanticisation of spy life and saw its protagonist, Alec Leamas, as a tragic hero. According to le Carré, it was largely American audiences who understood that the book was meant to convey the futility of spy work. Still wanting to convey the same message, le Carré wrote The Looking Glass War as an explicit satire, about a spy operation that was completely futile and pointless and the failure of which couldn't be considered a tragedy. He further sought to examine British nostalgia for the "glory days" of World War II, and how an ongoing fascination with Britain's victory in the conflict informed contemporary attitudes towards espionage. In doing so, he also culled details from his own time as an MI5 and MI6 agent, calling the bookalong with The Secret Pilgrimone of the most accurate reflections of his own experiences.

The book received a mixed-to-negative critical response, which le Carré credits to readers being upset that the book presented blatantly incompetent and largely unsympathetic characters. Writing in 2013, le Carré said that his "readers hated me for it", which he attributes to the public fascination and respect for spies: "Never mind how many times they trip over their cloaks and leave their daggers on the train to Tonbridge, the spies can do no wrong."

Although le Carré was upset with his fellow countrymen's response to the book, he was pleased that some American readersincluding members of the intelligence communityappreciated the book as a satire.

Adaptations

A film of the novel was released in 1969, starring Christopher Jones as Leiser, Ralph Richardson as LeClerc (sic), and Anthony Hopkins as Avery. It was directed by Frank Pierson.

As part of a series of dramatisation of Le Carré's work, the "Complete Smiley" series, BBC Radio produced a radio play of The Looking Glass War in 2009. Broadcast on BBC Radio 4, it starred Ian McDiarmid as Leclerc, Piotr Baumann as Leiser, Patrick Kennedy as Avery, and Simon Russell Beale as George Smiley.

Release details
1965, UK, William Heinemann , Pub date ? June 1965, Hardback
1965, USA, Putnam Pub. Group , Pub date ? June 1965, Hardback
1965, USA, Coward-McCann, Inc., New York, Book Club Edition, Hardback
1966, UK, Pan, London, Paperwork
April 1986, Hardback (Large Print)
1991, UK, Hodder & Stoughton Ltd , Pub date 21 November 1991, Hardback
1991, UK, Hodder & Stoughton (Coronet) , Pub date 21 November 1991, Paperback
1992, USA, Ballantine Books , Pub date ? March 1992, Paperback
1999, UK, Hodder & Stoughton , Pub date 22 February 1999, Audio cassette (read by John le Carré)

References

External links

1965 British novels
Cold War spy novels
Novels by John le Carré
Novels set in Germany
Heinemann (publisher) books
British novels adapted into films
British spy novels
Novels set in Finland